Ian Munro may refer to:
 Ian Munro (computer scientist) (born 1947), Canadian computer scientist
 Ian Munro (pianist) (born 1963), Australian pianist and composer
 Ian Munro, Canadian politician (see Progressive Conservative Party candidates, 1993 Canadian federal election)
 Ian Munro, English football manager with Wick Academy F.C.
 Ian Stafford Ross Munro (1919–1994), Australian ichthyologist and marine biologist

See also

Ian Monroe (born 1972), artist
Iain Munro (born 1951), Scottish footballer
Iain Monroe, fictional character
Ian Munro (born 1958), Australian television director